George Cookman Sturgiss (August 16, 1842 – February 26, 1925) was a lawyer and Republican politician who served as United States Representative for West Virginia's 2nd congressional district. He was a member of the 60th and 61st United States Congresses.

Biography
Sturgiss was born in Poland, Ohio in Mahoning County and attended country schools. In 1859, he moved to Morgantown, Virginia (now West Virginia). He attended and then taught at Monongalia Academy in Morgantown. He was admitted to the bar in 1863 and entered practice at Morgantown. During the Civil War he served as a clerk under Maj. James V. Boughner, paymaster of United States Volunteers. After the war, he became superintendent of free schools for Monongalia County and served in that capacity from 1865 to 1869.

From 1870 to 1872, Sturgiss was a member of the West Virginia House of Delegates. He then served as prosecuting attorney from 1872 to 1880. He became Republican nominee for Governor in 1880 but lost to Jacob B. Jackson. Subsequently, he was appointed by President Benjamin Harrison as United States Attorney for the district of West Virginia in 1889 and served four years. He was the first president of the State board of trade and of the State association for the promotion of good roads.

In 1906, Sturgiss was elected as a Republican to the Sixtieth and then to the Sixty-first Congress (March 4, 1907 – March 3, 1911). His candidacy for re-election in 1910 to the Sixty-second Congress was unsuccessful. He then became a trustee of American University in Washington, D.C. He was instrumental in the construction of the Morgantown & Kingwood Railroad. He served on the bench as a judge of the circuit court from 1912 to 1920. 

In 1919, while he was serving on the Circuit Court of Monongalia County, impeachment proceedings were initiated against Sturgiss. The Judiciary Committee of the West Virginia House of Delegates found that he was guilty of corruption, but the full West Virginia House of Delegates voted against impeachment, with the question of impeachment being voted on 28–55.

Sturgiss practiced law at Morgantown until his death on February 26, 1925, and was buried at Oak Grove Cemetery.

See also

United States congressional delegations from West Virginia

Sources

References

External links
 

1842 births
1925 deaths
19th-century American educators
19th-century American lawyers
20th-century American lawyers
20th-century American politicians
School superintendents in West Virginia
County prosecuting attorneys in West Virginia
Lawyers from Morgantown, West Virginia
Republican Party members of the West Virginia House of Delegates
People from Poland, Ohio
People of West Virginia in the American Civil War
Politicians from Morgantown, West Virginia
Republican Party members of the United States House of Representatives from West Virginia
Schoolteachers from West Virginia
Trustees of educational establishments
United States Attorneys for the District of West Virginia
West Virginia circuit court judges
West Virginia lawyers
Burials at Oak Grove Cemetery (Morgantown, West Virginia)